Malacology is the branch of invertebrate zoology that deals with the study of the Mollusca (mollusks or molluscs), the second-largest phylum of animals in terms of described species after the arthropods. Mollusks include snails and slugs, clams, and cephalopods, along with numerous other kinds, many of which have shells. One division of malacology, conchology, is devoted to the study of mollusk shells. Malacology derives .

Fields within malacological research include taxonomy, ecology and evolution. Applied malacology studies medical, veterinary, and agricultural applications; for example, mollusks as vectors of disease, as in schistosomiasis.

Archaeology employs malacology to understand the evolution of the climate, the biota of the area, and the usage of the site.

In 1681, Filippo Bonanni wrote the first book ever published that was solely about seashells, the shells of marine mollusks. The book was entitled:  In 1868, the German Malacological Society was founded.

Zoological methods are used in malacological research. Malacological field methods and laboratory methods (such as collecting, documenting and archiving, and molecular techniques) were summarized by Sturm et al. (2006).

Malacologists 

Those who study malacology are known as malacologists. Those who study primarily or exclusively the shells of mollusks are known as conchologists, while those who study mollusks of the class Cephalopoda are teuthologists.

Societies
 American Malacological Society
 Association of Polish Malacologists (Stowarzyszenie Malakologów Polskich)
 Belgian Malacological Society (Société Belge de Malacologie) – French speaking
 Belgian Society for Conchology – Dutch speaking
 Brazilian Malacological Society (Sociedade Brasileira de Malacologia)
 Conchological Society of Great Britain and Ireland
 Conchologists of America
 Dutch Malacological Society
 Estonian Malacological Society
 European Quaternary Malacologists
 Freshwater Mollusk Conservation Society
 German Malacological Society (Deutsche Malakozoologische Gesellschaft)
 Hungarian Malacological Society (Magyar Malakológiai Társaság)
 Italian Malacological Society (Società Italiana di Malacologia)
 Malacological Society of Australasia
 Malacological Society of London
 Malacological Society of the Philippines, Inc.
 Mexican Malacological Society (Sociedad Mexicana de Malacología y Conquiliología)
 Spanish Malacological Society (Sociedad Española de Malacología)
 Western Society of Malacologists

Journals
More than 150 journals within the field of malacology are being published from more than 30 countries, producing an overwhelming amount of scientific articles. They include:

 American Journal of Conchology (1865–1872)
 American Malacological Bulletin
 Archiv für Molluskenkunde
 Basteria
 Bulletin of Russian Far East Malacological Society
 Fish & Shellfish Immunology
 Folia conchyliologica
 Folia Malacologica
 Heldia
 Johnsonia
 Journal de Conchyliologie – volumes 1850–1922 at Biodiversity Heritage Library; volumes 1850–1938 at Bibliothèque nationale de France
 Journal of Conchology
 Journal of Medical and Applied Malacology
 Journal of Molluscan Studies
 Malacologia
 Malacologica Bohemoslovaca
 Malacological Review – volume 1 (1968) – today, contents of volume 27 (1996) – volume 40 (2009)
 Soosiana
 Zeitschrift für Malakozoologie (1844–1853) → Malakozoologische Blätter (1854–1878)
 Miscellanea Malacologica
 Mollusca
 Molluscan Research – impact factor: 0.606 (2007)
 Mitteilungen der Deutschen Malakozoologischen Gesellschaft
 Occasional Molluscan Papers (since 2008)
 Occasional Papers on Mollusks (1945–1989), 5 volumes
 Ruthenica
 Strombus
 Tentacle – The Newsletter of the Mollusc Specialist Group of the Species Survival Commission of the International Union for Conservation of Nature.
 The Conchologist (1891–1894) → The Journal of Malacology (1894–1905)
 The Festivus – a peer-reviewed journal which started as a club newsletter in 1970, published by the San Diego Shell Club
 The Nautilus – since 1886 published by Bailey-Matthews Shell Museum. First two volumes were published under name The Conchologists’ Exchange. Impact factor: 0.500 (2009)
 The Veliger – impact factor: 0.606 (2003)
 貝類学雑誌 Venus (Japanese Journal of Malacology)
 Vita Malacologica a Dutch journal published in English – one themed issue a year
 Vita Marina (discontinued in May 2001)

Museums 

Museums that have either exceptional malacological research collections (behind the scenes) and/or exceptional public exhibits of mollusks:

 Academy of Natural Sciences of Philadelphia
 American Museum of Natural History
 Bailey-Matthews Shell Museum
 Cau del Cargol Shell Museum
 Maria Mitchell Association
 Museum of Comparative Zoology at Harvard
 National Museum of Natural History, France
 Natural History Museum, London
 Rinay
 Royal Belgian Institute of Natural Sciences, Brussels: with a collection of more than 9 million shells (mainly from the collection of Philippe Dautzenberg)
 Smithsonian Institution

See also 
 Invertebrate paleontology
 History of invertebrate paleozoology
 Treatise on Invertebrate Paleontology

References

Further reading
 Cox L. R. & Peake J. F. (eds.). Proceedings of the First European Malacological Congress. September 17–21, 1962. Text in English with black-and-white photographic reproductions, also maps and diagrams. Published by the Conchological Society of Great Britain and Ireland and the Malacological Society of London in 1965 with no ISBN.
 Heppel D. (1995). "The long dawn of Malacology: a brief history of malacology from prehistory to the year 1800." Archives of Natural History 22(3): 301–319.

External links 

 Periodicals about molluscs at WorldCat

 
Subfields of zoology
Marine biology